The Tournament of Roses Parade has become such a large event that it requires 65,000 hours of combined manpower each year, or the equivalent of roughly 7.42 years of combined manpower. The Tournament of Roses Association has 935 members, each of whom is assigned to one of 34 committees, and 38 student ambassadors.

This group is headed by a president, who wears the traditional red jacket. While the president is officially elected in the third week of January following the New Year's Day parade and the Rose Bowl college football game, in reality, they were selected when first named to the executive committee eight years earlier. They spend four years as a vice president, then become secretary, treasurer, and executive vice-president before being named president. The newly elected President of the Tournament of Roses has the duty of picking a theme for the forthcoming festivities and selecting a Grand Marshal.  The President also approves lists of floats, equestrian units, Rose Queen and the Royal Court, and bands recommended by the various committees. The President has many duties including visiting each of the band participants during the year before the Parade and the many events in late December prior to the actual parade.

Presidents of the Tournament of Roses Association

 1889-90: Edward R. Murrow
 1890-91: Dr. Charles F. Holder
 1891-92: B. Marshall Wotkyns
 1892-93: Frank C. Bolt
 1894-95: Charles Daggett
 1896-97: Edwin Stearns
 1897-98: 
 1898-99: Martin H. Weight
 1899-1900: Herman Hertel
 1900-01: F.B. Weatherby
 1901-02: James B. Wagner
 1902-03: Charles Coleman
 1903-04: 
 1904-05: Charles Daggett
 1905-06: Edwin D. Neff
 1906-08: Edward T. Off (2yrs)
 1908-10: George P. Cary (2yrs)
 1910-11: Frank G. Hogan
 1912-13: Edward T. Off (2yrs)
 1913-14: R.D. Davis
 1914-15: John B. Coulston
 1915-16: Lewis H. Turner
 1916-17: D.M. Linnard
 1917-19: B.O. Kendall (2yrs)
 1919-21: William L. Leishman (2yrs)
 1921-23: John J. Mitchell (2yrs)
 1923-25: W.F. Creller (2yrs)
 1925-27: Harry M. Ticknor (2yrs)
 1927-29: Leslie B. Henry (2yrs)
 1929-31: C. Hal Reynolds (2yrs)
 1931-33: D.E. McDaneld (2yrs)
 1933-34: George S. Campbell
 1934-35: Charles Cobb (Deceased 10/14/34)
 1935-36: C. Elmer Anderson
 1936-37: Cyril Bennett
 1937-38: George S. Campbell
 1938-39: Lathrop K. Leishman
 1939-40: Harlan G. Loud
 1940-41: J.W. McCall, Jr.
 1941-42: Robert M. McCurdy
 1942-43: James K. Ingham
 1943-44: Frank M. Brooks
 1944-45: Max H. Turner
 1945-46: Charles A. Strutt
 1946-47: William P. Welsh
 1947-48: Louis R. Vinceti
 1948-49: Harold C. Schaffer
 1949-50: Drummond J. McCunn
 1950-51: L. Clifford Kenworthy
 1951-52: Leon Kingsley
 1952-53: William H. Nicholas
 1953-54: Harry W. Hurry
 1954-55: Elmer M. Wilson
 1955-56: Dr. Alfred L. Gerrie
 1956-57: John S. Davidson
 1957-58: John H. Biggar, Jr.
 1958-59: Stanley K. Brown
 1959-60: Raymond A. Dorn
 1960-61: Arthur W. Althouse
 1961-62: H. Burton Noble
 1962-63: Stanley L. Hahn
 1963-64: Hilles M. Bedell
 1964-65: Walter Hoefflin
 1965-66: J. Randolph Richards
 1966-67: Henry Kearns
 1967-68: H.W. Bragg
 1968-69: Gleeson L. Payne
 1969-70: C. Lewis Edwards
 1970-71: A. Lewis Shingler
 1971-72: John J. Cabot (Deceased 1/21/71)
 1971-72: Virgil J. White
 1972-73: Otis H. Blasingham
 1973-74: Edward Wilson
 1974-75: Carl H. Hoelscher (Deceased 3/24/74)
 1974-75: Paul G. Bryan
 1975-76: Ralph S. Helpbringer
 1976-77: Carl E. Wopschall
 1977-78: Harrison R. Baker, Jr.
 1978-79: Arthur D. Welsh
 1979-80: Frank Hardcastle
 1980-81: Millard Davidson
 1981-82: Harold E. Coombes, Jr.
      1982-83: Thornton H. Hamlin, Jr.
      1983-84: Donald Judson
      1984-85: James B. Boyle, Jr.
      1985-86: Frederick D. Johnson, Jr.
      1986-87: Fred W. Soldwedel
      1987-88: Harriman L. Cronk
      1988-89: John H. Biggar III
      1989-90: Don W. Fedde
      1990-91: Roy L. Coats
      1991-92: Robert L. Cheney
      1992-93: Gary K. Hayward
      1993-94: Delmer D. Beckhart (deceased 6/20/93)
      1994-95: Michael E. Ward
      1995-96: W.H. Griest Jr.
      1996-97: William S. Johnstone Jr.
      1997-98: Gareth A. Dorn
      1998-99: Dick E. Ratliff
      1999-2000: Kenneth H. Burrows
      2000–01: Lorne J. Brown
      2001–02: Ronald A. Okum
      2002–03: Gary Thomas
      2003–04: Michael K. Riffey
      2004–05: Dave Davis
      2005–06: Libby Evans Wright (first woman)
      2006–07: Paul Holman
      2007–08: CL Keedy
      2008–09: Ronald (Corky) H. Conzonire
      2009–10: Gary J. DiSano (Deceased 9/20/09)
      2010–11: Jeffrey Throop
      2011–12: Rick Jackson 
      2012–13: Sally Bixby
      2013–14: R. Scott Jenkins
      2014–15: Richard L. Chinen (first Asian-American)
      2015–16: Mike Matthiessen 
      2016–17: Brad Ratliff
      2017–18: Lance Tibbet
      2018–19: Gerald Freeny (first African-American)
      2019–20: Laura Farber (first Latina)
      2020–22: Dr. Robert B. Miller
      2022-23: Amy Wainscott
      2023-24: Alex Aghajanian (installed on 1/19/2023)

Gallery 
This is a gallery of recent Past Presidents.

References

People from Pasadena, California
presidents